Tony McNulty (born 6 March 1957) is an English former professional footballer who played as a forward, active in the Netherlands in the 1980s.

Career
Born in Liverpool, McNulty played for Veendam before moving to Twente in 1984. He then moved on to De Graafschap, and later played for Zwolle.

He later became an agent.

References

Living people
1957 births
English footballers
SC Veendam players
FC Twente players
De Graafschap players
PEC Zwolle players
Eerste Divisie players
Eredivisie players
Association football forwards
English expatriate footballers
English expatriate sportspeople in the Netherlands
Expatriate footballers in the Netherlands